Roseville Area High School (RAHS) is a public high school in Roseville, Minnesota, United States. It serves Roseville and the surrounding communities of Arden Hills, Falcon Heights, Lauderdale, Little Canada, Maplewood, and Shoreview. RAHS is the only comprehensive public high school in Roseville Area School District 623.

History
RAHS occupies the site of a high school known as Alexander Ramsey High School. In 1986 Ramsey High School and Frank B. Kellogg High School merged because of declining enrollment at both schools. The new high school used the facilities from the Ramsey complex while the former Kellogg High School became Roseville Area Middle School.

Plans originally called for the construction of a new high school (replacing both Ramsey and Kellogg) on district-owned land near Lake Owasso, but after the voter referendum on financing the proposed school failed, it became necessary to expand and remodel the existing Roseville Area High School instead. The land held by the school district was sold and the proceeds used to finance the construction at RAHS. The community built on the sold land is now known as Owasso Hills.

During the 1986–87 school year, RAHS operated on two campuses, with both East Campus (the former Kellogg site) and West Campus (formerly Ramsey) serving grades 9–12. From 1987 to 1997, RAHS had only 10th12th grades, with 9th grade at Roseville Area Middle School. On completion of the construction in fall 1997, the 9th grade was moved to RAHS.

Starting in 2019, the building began to be renovated and expanded by the Kraus-Anderson construction company, leading to updates of the main building, and the construction of a new E Wing building, with a majority of the renovations being completed as of 2021.

Academics 
RAHS operates on a trimester system and allows students to take a maximum of five credits each trimester. RAHS offers a variety of Advanced Placement (AP), College in the Schools (CIS), Honors, Connections and standard track curriculum.

Advanced Placement
AP offerings at RAHS include AP American government, AP Biology, AP Environmental Science,  AP Calculus AB, AP Calculus BC, AP Chemistry, AP comparative government, AP Computer Science Principles, AP language & composition, AP literature & composition, AP European History, AP Human Geography, AP Microeconomics, AP Psychology, AP Physics 1, AP Statistics, AP Art History and AP Studio Art.

The English, mathematics and social studies curricula include ninth and tenth grade level pre-AP courses. In 2007, Roseville Area School District 623 received a $720,000 grant from the Minnesota Department of Education to expand AP and pre-AP programming in the district.

College in the Schools
College in the Schools (CIS) is a program run by the University of Minnesota that allows high school students to attain college credit while staying in their high school. The University of Minnesota CIS courses offered at RAHS are modern literature (ENGL 1001W) and Spanish (SPAN 1003, SPAN 1004).

Post-Secondary Enrollment Options (PSEO)
In addition to curriculum offered at RAHS, in accordance with state law, upperclassmen in good academic standing may choose to enroll in post-secondary courses at no cost. Students can apply part-time or full-time to a number of affiliated institutions, including Century College, Macalester College and the University of Minnesota. Credits earned at post-secondary institutions fulfill both high school and college credit requirements, and all high school graduation requirements must still be met.

Sports and activities
RAHS is a member of the Suburban East Conference. It provides students with many varsity athletic opportunities. Fall sports include boys' and girls' cross country, football, football cheerleading, boys' and girls' soccer, girls' swimming and diving, girls' tennis, and volleyball. In the winter, options include boys' and girls' alpine skiing, boys' and girls' basketball, basketball cheerleading, competitive dance team, girls' gymnastics, boys' and girls' hockey, boys' and girls' Nordic skiing, boys' swim and dive, and wrestling. During the spring, students may participate in baseball, boys' and girls' golf, boys' and girls' lacrosse, softball, boys' tennis, and boys' and girls' track and field.

In addition to varsity athletics, RAHS also offers over 60 extracurricular activities throughout the year. These include 623 productions, African American leaders, anime club, art club, Authors Anonymous, badminton/table tennis club, bowling, brass quintet, breakdance club, cello choir, chamber orchestra, chess club, clarinet choir, policy and LD (Lincoln and Douglas) debate teams, D.E.C.A., drama, E.A.R.T.H. group, fall dance team, fencing, flute choir, food shelf, Frisbee golf, future problem solvers, gamers' union, gay/straight alliance, chamber choir, Hearts Against Hunger, IM volleyball, international club, Japanese club, jazz ensembles I, II, & III, Karen club, Latino club, math team, morning choir, Muslim Student Association, National Honor Society, outdoor club, Peb Haiv, peer connections, percussion ensemble, prom committee, Progressive club, quiz/knowledge bowl, RADD, robotics team, school newspaper, science club, secular student alliance, skills USA, ski/snowboarding, speech, S.T.A.N.D., string quartet, Students Advocating Gender Equality, student council, Students in Action, ultimate frisbee, VOX jazz choir, wind ensemble, woodwind quintet, and yearbook.

School song
The Raiders' Fight Song was written by former University of Minnesota Director of Bands Dr. Frank Bencriscutto. Its melody is an inverted version of the old Frank B. Kellogg High School fight song, also written by Bencriscutto.

Notable alumni

Alexander Ramsey High School
 Loni Anderson (Class of 1963) – actress
 Mohammad Aslam Khan Khalil (Class of 1966) – theoretical physicist
 Stephen Paulus (Class of 1967) – Grammy-nominated composer
 Richard Dean Anderson (Class of 1968) – actor, MacGyver, Stargate SG-1 
 Ming Sen Shiue (Class of 1969), convicted murderer and rapist
 Rebecca Blank (Class of 1973) – economist; Acting U.S. Secretary of Commerce; Chancellor, University of Wisconsin-Madison
 Greg Mortenson (Class of 1975) – literacy advocate, executive director of the Central Asia Institute, bestselling co-author of Three Cups of Tea
 Peter Krause (Class of 1983) – Emmy-nominated TV actor, most notably on the series Six Feet Under and Parenthood

Roseville Area High School
 Tim Foster (Class of 1987) – professional soccer player
 John D. McCormick (Class of 1987) – journalist at the Chicago Tribune who followed the 2008 Barack Obama presidential campaign 
 Rod Smith (Class of 1988) – American football defensive back, played 7 seasons in the NFL
 Chris McAlpine (Class of 1990) – professional hockey player with NJ Devils and six other NHL teams
 Niko Medved (Class of 1992) – basketball coach
 Winny Brodt-Brown (Class of 1996) – hockey player, winner of first Minnesota Ms. Hockey Award, silver medalist at 2000 & 2001 IIHF World Ice Hockey Championships 
 Marty Sertich (Class of 2001) – hockey player, won Hobey Baker Award in 2005 as nation's top collegiate player
 Mike Muscala (Class of 2009) – college basketball player for the Bucknell Bison, Patriot League Men's Basketball Player of the Year in 2010–11, professional basketball player for the Oklahoma City Thunder.
Lee Stecklein (Class of 2012) – member of 2014 (silver medal) & 2018 (gold medal) U.S. women's Olympic ice hockey team.
Jesper Horsted (Class of 2015) -professional football player for the Chicago Bears.
Maggie Nichols (Class of 2016)- Member of 2013, 2014, and 2015 U.S. National Gymnastics team as well as 2015 World Championship team.

Notable faculty
 Tom Tillberry (counselor) – former member of the Minnesota House of Representatives representing District 51B

References

External links
 

Educational institutions established in 1986
Public high schools in Minnesota
Buildings and structures in Roseville, Minnesota
Schools in Ramsey County, Minnesota
1986 establishments in Minnesota